was a Japanese doctor who studied infectious diseases.  

Futaki was educated at Tokyo Imperial University. He received the prestigious Order of Culture (Bunka Kunshō) from the Emperor for his academic contributions, which included identifying the infectious agents of dysentery and rat bite fever, He was a candidate for the Nobel Prize in Physiology or Medicine. In addition to his medical research, he had a strong understanding of traditional Japanese folk remedies.

References

Japanese infectious disease physicians
1873 births
1966 deaths
Place of death missing